Cruel Intentions: The '90s Musical, known during its off-Broadway run as Cruel Intentions: The Musical, is a 2015 American jukebox musical based on the 1999 film Cruel Intentions, with a score made up of hit songs from the 1990s. The musical's book is by Roger Kumble, Lindsey Rosin and Jordan Ross; Kumble was the writer and director of the original film. The film Cruel Intentions is itself a modern-day telling of the 1782 French novel Les Liaisons dangereuses by Pierre Choderlos de Laclos.

After successful performances in Los Angeles and New York, the show made its Off-Broadway debut at Greenwich Village nightclub Le Poisson Rouge in November 2017. Originally scheduled for a ten-week engagement, the show was extended three times, through April 2018.

Synopsis

Enter the manipulative world of Manhattan's most dangerous liaisons: Sebastian Valmont and Kathryn Merteuil. Fueled by revenge and passion, the diabolically charming step-siblings place a bet on whether or not Sebastian can deflower their incoming headmaster's daughter, Annette Hargrove. As the two set out to destroy the innocent girl — and anyone else who gets in their way — they find themselves playing a perilous game with only one rule: Never fall in love. The show was the first theater production ever staged at the club Le Poisson Rouge, which offered bar and table service.

Musical numbers
Act I
 "Every You Every Me" (Placebo)
 "I'm the Only One" (Melissa Etheridge)
 "Genie In a Bottle" (Christina Aguilera)
 "Just a Girl" (No Doubt)
 "I Want It That Way" (The Backstreet Boys) (Sometimes exchanged with "Candy" (Mandy Moore †))
 "Kiss Me" (Sixpence None The Richer)
 "Lovefool" (The Cardigans)
 "Sex and Candy" (Marcy Playground)†
 "I Want It That Way" (Backstreet Boys)/"Bye Bye Bye" (NSYNC)
 "Breakfast At Tiffany's" (Deep Blue Something)
 "No Scrubs" (TLC)
 "Only Happy When It Rains" (Garbage)/Act 1 Medley
Act II
 "The Sign" (Ace of Base)†
 "No Scrubs (Reprise)" (TLC)
 "I Don't Want To Wait" (Paula Cole)†
 "I'll Make Love To You" (Boyz II Men) (Sometimes exchanged with "2 Become 1" (Spice Girls †))
 "Torn" (Natalie Imbruglia version, originally by Ednaswap)
 "Sometimes" (Britney Spears)†
 "Colorblind" (Counting Crows)
 "Sunday Morning" (No Doubt) †
 "Iris" (Goo Goo Dolls)
 "Foolish Games" (Jewel)
 "Bitch" (Meredith Brooks)/"Losing My Religion" (R.E.M.)/Kathryn's Turn Medley
 "Lovefool (Reprise)" (The Cardigans) †
 "Bitter Sweet Symphony" (The Verve)

† Not on the original cast recording.

‡ Not credited in all performances.

Cast and creative
The musical was created by Jordan Ross, Lindsey Rosin (who also served as the original director), and Roger Kumble, choreographed by Jennifer Weber, with music supervision and arrangements by Zach Spound. The show was produced by Eva Price and Sucker Love Productions.

Critical reception
The show was well received. The New York Times called the musical "funny and nostalgia-fueled" and noted that "the choice lines and the inspired soundtrack hits are all there in this enjoyable show". Entertainment Weekly complimented the show's use of 90's pop hits. InStyle Magazine described the show as "brilliant and magical", with "top-notch performances by a supremely talented cast".

Notes

References

Jukebox musicals
2015 musicals
Musicals based on films
Teen musicals
Off-Broadway musicals
Plays set in the 1990s
Works based on Les Liaisons dangereuses